Beyg Kandi may refer to:
 Beyg Kandi, East Azerbaijan
 Beyg Kandi Rud, East Azerbaijan Province
 Beyg Kandi, Qazvin
 Beyg Kandi, West Azerbaijan